Jászszentlászló is a village in Bács-Kiskun county, in the Southern Great Plain region of southern Hungary. It lies just south of Kiskunfélegyháza and just north of Kiskunmajsa.  The town is a stop on the railroad line between Kecskemét and Baja.

Geography

Economy
There are several agricultural enterprises. Some pumpjacks still raise crude oil from the ground.

References

External links 
 Hivatalos oldal
 Startlap linkgyűjtemény

Populated places in Bács-Kiskun County